Mir Abdul Aziz was a commander in the Mughal Empire.

Battle of Bayana 
Abdul Aziz was appointed by Babur to lead an advance guard to check Rana Sanga's advance. However he was defeated at the Battle of Bayana.

Battle of Khanwa 
In 1527 Abdul Aziz participated in the Battle of Khanwa where he led a contingent of the Mughal Army and the Mughals inflicted a crushing defeat on the Rajputs led by Rana Sanga during this battle. Rana Sanga got badly wounded by an arrow during the battle and was subsequently removed from the battleground in unconscious  state by Prithviraj Kachwaha of Amber.

References 

Mughal Empire people